Los Aldamas is a municipality located in the northeast part of the Mexican state of Nuevo León. It is bordered to the north by the state of Tamaulipas, to the south with the municipalities of Doctor Coss and China, to the east with the municipality of Dr. Coss, N.L and the state of Tamaulipas and to the west with the municipalities of General Treviño, Melchor Ocampo and Los Herreras, N.L.

History

Franciscan priests founded the town in 1760 using the name of Guadalupe Mission, in an area then known as Puerto de Hoyos, which was a watering hole for cattle on the west bank of the San Juan River. 

On Christmas Eve 1825, the Congress of the newly created State of Nuevo León, decreed the foundation of a new township to be located at Puerto de Los Hoyos with the name of Villa de Santa María de Aldama. In 1829, the name was changed to Villa de Santa María de Los Aldamas, the additional "s" to avoid confusion with Villa de Aldama, also located in Nuevo Leon. The name was in honor of brothers Juan Aldama and Ignacio Aldama, heroes of the Mexican War of Independence.

During the Mexican Revolution, the municipality served as temporary capitol of the state from February to May, 1914.

External links
 Official website

Municipalities of Nuevo León